Palmital is a municipality in the state of São Paulo, Brazil. The population is 22,272 (2020 est.) in an area of 548 km². Its altitude is 508m. Its economy is based on agriculture and cattle raising. The town is known for having the biggest carnaval festivities of the area.

See also
List of municipalities in São Paulo

References

Municipalities in São Paulo (state)